Gabriel Michel (born 12 October 1973) is a Haitian football midfielder who played for Don Bosco FC. Capped 21 times for Haiti, all of his 3 goals game in the same 2002 FIFA World Cup qualification game against Bahamas.

References

1973 births
Living people
Haitian footballers
Haiti international footballers
Don Bosco FC players
Association football midfielders
Ligue Haïtienne players
2000 CONCACAF Gold Cup players